Pellea is a Romanian surname. Notable people with the surname include:

Amza Pellea (1931–1983), Romanian actor
Oana Pellea (born 1962), Romanian actor, daughter of Amza

See also
Peller

Romanian-language surnames